Charles Mercer Snelling (November 3, 1862 – September 19, 1939) was the chancellor of the University of Georgia (UGA) in Athens, Georgia, from 1925 to 1932 and the first chancellor of the Georgia Board of Regents of the University System of Georgia (1932–1933). All UGA leaders after Snelling have been referred to as president (the previous title before the 1860 University reorganization that created the UGA Chancellor position).

Biography
Snelling was born in Richmond, Virginia, and graduated from the Virginia Military Institute in 1884. He taught mathematics there when he graduated, then at the Georgia Military Institute in 1885–1886, as well as a 2-year stint teaching at South Georgia College in Thomasville. Snelling came to the university in 1888 as an adjunct professor of mathematics and commandant of cadets. He became a professor in 1897, and dean of the university in 1909.

Accomplishments
Accomplishments of Snelling as the UGA Chancellor include:
Forming the Bureau of Business Research in 1929
Established the Institute of Public Affairs (1927)
Reorganized the Lumpkin Law School
Hired Ms. J.H. Bryan as the first female faculty member (Journalism, 1928)
The Department of Music and Fine Arts was organized in 1926 under Hugh Hodgson
Formed the division of General Extension to oversee adult education
Oversaw completion of various buildings [Women's P.E. Building (1928); Brooks Hall (1928); Sanford Stadium (1929); Military Science Building (1931); Hirsch Hall (Law School, 1932)]

After Snelling's tenure as the University System Chancellor, he became director of adult education for the state, a post he held until his death on September 19, 1939 in Athens. The Snelling Dining Commons is a south campus facility named in his honor.

References

External links
History of the University of Georgia by Thomas Walter Reed; Frontmatter and Chapter I: The Beginnings of the University, Thomas Walter Reed,  Imprint:  Athens, Georgia : University of Georgia, ca. 1949
From Ahmedunggar to Lavonia Presidents at the University of Georgia 1785-1997, University of Georgia Libraries, Hargrett Rare Book and Manuscript Library
Charles M. Snelling Hargrett library, past exhibits, UGA presidents
Finding Aid for The Charles Mercer Snelling Papers 1904 - 1950 (UGA 97 - 096) Hargrett library, university archives, guide to print collections
Milestones, Feb. 22, 1932 Time magazine

1862 births
1939 deaths
Presidents of the University of Georgia
Chancellors of the Georgia Board of Regents